National Gold Bank Notes were National Bank Notes issued by nine national gold banks in California in the 1870s and 1880s and redeemable in gold. Printed on a yellow-tinted paper, six denominations circulated: $5, $10, $20, $50, $100, and $500. A $1,000 note was designed and printed but never issued. During the issuing period of national gold banks (1871–83), the U.S. Treasury issued 200,558 notes totaling $3,465,240. Today, National Gold Bank Notes are rare in the higher denominations (and unknown on some issuing banks) with condition generally falling in the good-to-fine range. Approximately 630 National Gold Bank Notes are known to exist, and roughly 20 grade above "very fine".

History

The National Gold Bank Notes were authorized under the provisions of the Currency Act of July 12, 1870. The series was a result of the California Gold Rush, where gold coins were preferred in commerce. Ten national gold banks were charted, nine of them in California and one in Boston, Massachusetts.

The Kiddler Bank was the only bank to have $1,000 notes among others prepared, however, no notes circulated from the bank.

Issuing banks

Series overview

Footnotes

Notes

References

External links

 About Paper Money - Large-size paper money - Early federal issues Coin World
 Pictures of National Gold Bank Notes The Federal Reserve Bank of San Francisco

Banknotes of the United States
Historical currencies of the United States
1870s in California
1880s in California
Economy of California